Cheng Wen (Chinese: 程文; born 6 April 1989 in Binzhou) is a Chinese athlete who competes in the 400 metre hurdles. He represented his country at the 2012 Summer Olympics, as well as the 2011 World Championships.

His personal best in the event is 49.28 seconds, set in Fuzhou in 2011.

Competition record

References 

1989 births
Living people
Chinese male hurdlers
Athletes (track and field) at the 2012 Summer Olympics
Olympic athletes of China
Runners from Shandong
Athletes (track and field) at the 2014 Asian Games
People from Binzhou
World Athletics Championships athletes for China
Asian Games medalists in athletics (track and field)
Asian Games bronze medalists for China
Medalists at the 2014 Asian Games